Tush may refer to:

subgroup of Georgians Tushs or Tushetians
A slang term for the buttocks
Any of the canine teeth, of a horse
Tush, the Bats language of the Bats people, who live in Tusheti
"Tush" (ZZ Top song), a 1975 song by ZZ Top from their album Fandango!
"Tush" (Ghostface Killah song), a 2004 song by Ghostface Killah from his album The Pretty Toney Album
Tush (band), a band that at one time featured Def Leppard guitarist Phil Collen
T.U.S.H., a 1970s Belgian rock band featuring Dany Lademacher and Walter de Paduwa
Tush (TV series), a 1980s variety show with Bill Tush

Places 
Berkat Tush

People 
Bill Tush (born 1948), American news journalist and humorist

See also 
Tush Magazine NG
Tushmanlu (disambiguation)
Tushy (disambiguation)
Tush Tepe
Tush Tush Tush
Tush kiiz